Unxia is a genus of flowering plants in the family Asteraceae.

References

Neurolaeneae
Asteraceae genera